Beiszer Nunatak is a nunatak,  high, standing  south of Ray Nunatak at the southwest end of the Forrestal Range, Pensacola Mountains. It was mapped by the United States Geological Survey from surveys and from U.S. Navy air photos, 1956–66, and named by the Advisory Committee on Antarctic Names for John E. Beiszer, an aviation structural mechanic at Ellsworth Station, winter 1957.

References 

Nunataks of Queen Elizabeth Land